The Netherlands Symphony Orchestra is a Dutch symphony orchestra.  The home of the orchestra is the Muziekcentrum in Enschede. The orchestra was previously known in Dutch as Orkest van het Oosten (literal translation "Orchestra of the East"), but in October 2011 changed its Dutch name to align with the English name. At the same time the Dutch abbreviation "OvhO" was replaced with "NedSym." Due to objections from the Amsterdam-based Netherlands Philharmonic Orchestra, the Enschede orchestra had to change its name again and from 2014 till 2019 was 
known as HET Symfonieorkest ("THE Symphony orchestra"). Internationally it keeps employing the name "Netherlands Symphony Orchestra".

As of September 2019, after fusion with the orchestra of Gelderland the name of the orchestra is "Phion, Orkest van Gelderland & Overijssel" (Phion, orchestra of Gelderland & Overijssel).

Netherlands Symphony Orchestra performs about 75 concerts a year in Enschede, Hengelo, Zwolle and Deventer, as well as throughout the province of Overijssel and the Randstad.  NedSym also serves as orchestra with the Dutch Touring Opera (Nederlandse Reisopera) for two productions a year and various provincial choirs.

History
The precursor ensemble to the Orkest van het Oosten was the Twents Kamerorkest (Twents Chamber Orchestra), an amateur ensemble which began performing in the 1930s under the direction of Klaas de Rook.  In 1947, this orchestra changed its name to the Twents Philharmonisch Orkest (Twents Philharmonic Orchestra).  In 1954, the orchestra became fully professional under the name of the Overijssels Philharmonisch Orkest (Overijssels Philharmonic Orchestra), incorporating musicians from the Twents Harpsichord Ensemble and the Twents Chamber Orchestra.

In 1983, the Overijssels Philharmonic Orchestra was merged with Opera Forum. The two orchestras were joined together as the Forum Philharmonic operating in two formations: one for accompanying the opera the other for symphonic concerts, and a few times a year both together for large scale productions. In 1994, the orchestra was seriously reduced and formed an independent ensemble under the name Orkest van het Oosten.  At the same time, in 1994, the Nationale Reisopera (which in 2014 changed its name to Nederlandse Reisopera) was organised from Opera Forum, without an orchestra. The Orkest van het Oosten was contracted to accompany two  Reisopera productions a year.

Conductors
Jaap van Zweden was chief conductor of the OvhO from 1996 to 2005.  Since the 2006-2007 season, Jan Willem de Vriend has been chief conductor of the OvhO, with an initial contract of 3 years.  Although there have been reports of controversy over his direction of the OvhO, his contract with the OvhO has been extended to 2012.  In 2010 the "Orkest van het Oosten" was awarded with an Edison award.  In January 2016, the orchestra announced that de Vriend is to conclude his tenure as chief conductor at the end of the 2016-2017 season.

Chief conductors
 Jaap van Zweden (1996–2005)
 Jan Willem de Vriend (2006–2017)
 Ed Spanjaard (2017–present)

References

External links
 Official website of the Nederlands Symfonieorkest
 Raad voor Cultuur (Culture Council), Dutch-language official economic document on the Orkest van het Oosten

Dutch orchestras
Musical groups established in the 1930s
1930s establishments in the Netherlands